Kanyakumari ranks first in literacy among the districts of Tamil Nadu. The district has many educational institutions. The following are lists of colleges in the district of Kanyakumari.

Engineering

Arts and science

Medical

Siddha and homeopathy

Polytechnic 

|-
|Morning star polytechnic   College chunkankadai,      nagercoil                         |}
|-

References 

Universities and colleges in Kanyakumari district
Kanyakumari